The Peruvian Olympic Committee (COP) is the National Olympic Committee representing Peruvian athletes in the International Olympic Committee (IOC), the Pan American Games and the Central American and Caribbean Games. By the IOC was created 1924 and recognized in 1936.

The Peruvian Olympic Committee is headquartered in Lima, Peru.

See also
 Peru at the Olympics
 Peru at the Paralympics
 Peru at the Pan American Games

External links
 Official website 

Peru
Sports governing bodies in Peru
Peru at the Olympics
1924 establishments in Paraguay